Tomáš Butta (born 12 June 1958 in Prague) is the eighth patriarch of the Czechoslovak Hussite Church.

In 1984 Butta graduated from seminary and was ordained as a priest.  He received appointment as a rector in the Hradec Králové Region. In 1997 he acquired his doctorate in theology from Charles University in Prague.

On 23 September 2006 he was elected to the position of patriarch of the Czechoslovak Hussite Church.  He replaced Jan Schwarz who had resigned in 2005.

Notes

References
This article is based in part on material from the Czech Wikipedia.

1958 births
Living people
Clergy from Prague
Czechoslovak Hussite Church bishops
21st-century archbishops
Independent Catholic patriarchs
Charles University alumni